AN/SPS-10 is a two-dimensional radar manufactured by Raytheon Technologies. It was used by the US Navy as a surface-search radar after World War II, and was equipped aboard naval ships during the Cold War. Variants include AN/SPS-10B, AN-SPS/10E and AN/SPS-10F.

AN/SPS-10 
It was first introduced in 1959 during the Fleet Rehabilitation and Modernization. In which was equipped aboard Gearing-class, Fletcher-class, Allen M. Sumner-class and Benson-class destroyers. Since then it has been a normal standard for US Navy ships to be equipped with it throughout the Cold War.

By 1998, the radar has been put out of service by AN/SPS-502.

On board ships

United States 
 Essex-class aircraft carrier
 Forrestal-class aircraft carrier 
 Kitty Hawk-class aircraft carrier
 
 Iowa-class battleship
 Worcester-class cruiser
 Baltimore-class cruiser
 Boston-class cruiser
 Providence-class cruiser
 Leahy-class cruiser
 Albany-class cruiser
 Belknap-class cruiser
 Galveston-class cruiser
 
 
  Fletcher-class destroyer
 Gearing-class destroyer
 Allen M. Sumner-class destroyer
 Charles F. Adams-class destroyer
 Farragut-class destroyer
 Forrest Sherman-class destroyer
 Mitscher-class destroyer
 Claud Jones-class destroyer escort
 Edsall-class destroyer escort
 Dealey-class destroyer escort
 Knox-class frigate 
 Bronstein-class frigate
 Garcia-class frigate
 Brooke-class frigate
 Blue Ridge-class command ship
 Raleigh-class amphibious transport dock
 Thomaston-class dock landing ship
 Sacramento-class fast combat support ship
 Wichita-class replenishment oiler
 Mars-class combat stores ship
 Alstede-class stores ship
 Kilauea-class ammunition ship
 Neosho-class oiler

Thailand 
 Surangkana-class destroyer escort

Canada 
 St. Laurent-class destroyer
 Restigouche-class destroyer
 Mackenzie-class destroyer
 Annapolis-class destroyer

See More 

 List of radars
 Radar configurations and types
 surface-search radar

Citations

References 
 Norman Friedman (2006). The Naval Institute Guide to World Naval Weapon Systems.  Naval Institute Press.  ISBN 
 Self-Defense Force Equipment Yearbook 2006-2007. Asaun News Agency. ISBN 4-7509-1027-9

Naval radars
Military radars of the United States
Military equipment introduced in the 1950s